Associazione Calcio Cantù Gruppo Sportivo San Paolo Associazione Sportiva Dilettantistica is an Italian association football club, based in Cantù, Lombardy. Cantù San Paolo will play in Eccellenza.

History

Cantù San Paolo 
A.C. Cantù G.S. San Paolo A.S.D. was founded in the summer 2000 with the merger between A.C. Cantù (founded in 1910 and playing in Seconda Categoria Lombardy) and G.S. San Paolo (founded in 1985 and playing in Prima Categoria Lombardy). The team took part in the Prima Categoria and its second attempt to conquer the Promozione.

Mark Ronchetti grenade on the bench arrives which at the second attempt leads the team in Eccellenza. The first vintage in the new category ends with a last-minute salvation: the player Brianza Como, with a goal almost at the end, does the play-off win against play-out Giana Erminio Gorgonzola. Stores a negative season that has never seen Cantù players, opens a new ambitious project, one for winning promotion to Serie D. The team is in form throughout the tournament but reached the top of the list in Merate, the Brianza can no longer win, falling into crisis. Dreams are broken in the regional final, won by 2–0 by the Voluntas Osio Sotto in Bergamo.

In the 2008–09 season Cantù San Paolo was promoted in Serie D by beating in national play-off final Fondi for 2–1. In the season 2011–12 it was relegated to Eccellenza.

The football in Cantù before the merger

A.C. Cantù 
The origins of football in Cantù go back to 1910 when was founded Club Sportivo Canturino. Field of play and training was on the stage of Milan. After playing for three years with the teams at Como Ulice, is affiliated to the two dispute FIGC and the Quarta Divisione championship, gaining a second place in 1924–25 which earned him admission to the Terza Divisione for 1925–26.

Gets the best placement in the season 1926–27, finishing in second place with three points from Seregno, but suddenly stops the activity remaining idle for a season. In season 1928–29 under the name Dopolavoro Cantù burns all stages: in the space of three seasons come to play in Prima Categoria (1932–1933).

It retired at the end of the 1933–34 First Division championship for financial reasons, reappeared in the Lombardy regional championships with the return of young people after the end of the war in Ethiopia, affiliating with the new name of Associazione Calcio Cantù.

The years of Serie C 
The forties are the golden era of football in the town in Brianza. The team on a regular grenade dispute the Serie C, participating in the Cup three times in Italy. The best result was achieved in the domestic cup in the 1939–1940 season, when it was eliminated from Biellese to the third qualifying round after overcoming Codogno and Caratese.

The post-war period and the first failure 
In 1960 the team, for economic failures, was forced to abandon the competitive activity.

The restart with F.C. Cantù 
The following year he founded a new club, the Football Club Cantù, whose playing field is always on the green rectangle of Milan. The sailing team championships in the Prima Categoria and Seconda Categoria (current leagues Promozione and Eccellenza) for many years.

The arrival of Mobil Girgi and return to Serie D 
In 1971, the Mobil Girgi company, engaged in the furnishing sector, took over the company who became  F.C. Arredi Girgi Cantù' and paves the way for the return of Cantù to competitive football levels . In the season 1972–73 wins the Prima Categoria and is promoted to Serie D.

The first year of Serie D (1973–74) the Cantù finished 13th, with two points more than relegation places. The next year (season 1974–75) was fired from the championship duel with Pro Patria and freedom for promotion to Serie C: finally the promotion was lost. Direct comparisons both ended in a draw, fatal to the team's 1–0 defeat Cantù was remedied on 14 May in Lodi in the recovery against the Fanfulla, which in fact gave mathematics chances to promotion for Cantù, before then separated by three points and with two matches to play. The following season was the last in Serie D: second lowest disappointing season and initiate the decline of society. The only positive of this disappointing season was the debut of a player who then wins the Scudetto with Inter shirt: Gianfranco Matteoli.

Decline 
From that moment, because of the abandonment of the family Girgi for political conflicts, on the Cantù begins an inexorable decline that led it, in a few years, to the bottom, playing so many different leagues between the Prima Categoria and Seconda Categoria.

G.S. San Paolo 
G.S. San Paolo was founded in 1985 and towards the end of the nineties even it surpasses the glorious city society of A.C. Cantù playing in Prima Categoria.

Colors and badge 
The team's colors are all-dark red.

References

External links 
Official site

Football clubs in Lombardy
Association football clubs established in 2000
Serie C clubs
2000 establishments in Italy